Sylvia J Needham (born 1935), is a female former athlete who competed for England.

Athletics career
She represented England in the discus at the 1958 British Empire and Commonwealth Games in Cardiff, Wales.

References

1935 births
English female discus throwers
Athletes (track and field) at the 1958 British Empire and Commonwealth Games
Living people
Commonwealth Games competitors for England